In ancient Greece, the concept of autochthones (from Ancient Greek  autos "self," and  chthon "soil"; i.e. "people sprung from earth itself") means the indigenous inhabitants of a country, including mythological figures, as opposed to settlers, and those of their descendants who kept themselves free from an admixture of colonizing entities.

In mythology, autochthones are those mortals who have sprung from the soil, rocks and trees. They are rooted and belong to the land eternally.

Mythology
Autochthons are reported in the mythology of the following regions: In Attica: Amphictyon, Cecrops I, Cranaus, Erichthonius, Periphas. In Boeotia: Ogyges, Alalcomenes, Spartoi. In the Peloponnese: Pelasgus of Arcadia, Lelex of Laconia and Aras of Phliasia. Finally, in Atlantis, Evenor.

The practice in ancient Greece of describing legendary heroes and men of ancient lineage as "earthborn" greatly strengthened the doctrine of autochthony. In Thebes, the race of Spartoi were believed to have sprung from a field sown with dragons' teeth. The Phrygian Corybantes had been forced out of the hill-side like trees by Rhea, the great mother, and hence were called δενδροφυεῖς. It is clear from the Ancient Greek play Prometheus Bound, commonly attributed to Aeschylus, that primitive men were supposed to have at first lived like animals in caves and woods, until by the help of the gods and heroes they were raised to a stage of civilization.

Tribes in historiography
Ancient myth of autochthony in historiography is the belief of the historian or the tribe itself, that they were indigenous, the first humans to inhabit their possessed land. The term occurs firstly in 5th century BC ethnographic passages.  In Herodotus:

In Thucydides:

In a fragment of Hellanicus, the author states that the "Athenians, Arcadians, Aeginetans and Thebans are autochthones."  Strabo, elaborating the ethnographic Homeric passage on Crete, describes Cydonians and Eteocretans as autochthones.

Athenian autochthony concept
Athenians of 5th and 4th century, during the age of Athenian Empire, claimed with pride of being an autochthonous nation, that had never changed their place of habitation. According to Thucydides, Attica, where Athens is located, had known few migrations due to the poverty of the soil.  They had personified their autochthony in the form of Erechtheus or Cecrops I and wore golden tettiges, or cicada-shaped ornaments in their hair as a token representing their belief that, like cicadas, Athenians were born from the soil and thus had always lived in Attica. This also served as another link between Athena and Athens, as Erechtheus was believed to be raised by Athena.

Separate from the political ideology of autochthonism, this concept of Athenian autochthony has been linked to the rise of Athenian democracy. In contrast to the previous regime of Tyrants and Oligarchs, and their strict power hierarchies, autochthony was as an argument for democracy and egalitarianism. All Athenians were earth-brothers and thus deserved to have equal access to political power.

The “autochthony” of the Athenians was a common theme on vase paintings, in political rhetoric, and on the tragic stage.  In the epideictic oration of Panegyricus, Isocrates addressed to his countrymen with the following passage:

Athenian autochthony also links to nationalistic political ideology in the fifth and fourth century. It justifies Athenian greatness and conquest over other poleis. In Menexenes, Plato has Socrates explaining the Athenian hatred against the barbarians

It is unclear or unlikely that the above ideas belong to Plato himself, since Menexenus, the only non-philosophical Platonic work, has been regarded as a parody, a mock-patriotic funeral speech of Pericles or Aspasia, but in any case it provides an image of the Athenian ideology of that time.

On the other hand, Herodotus gives the following passage on the Attic genealogy, which references migratory origins in contrast to the myth of autochthony:

See also
 Spontaneous generation
 History of Athens
 Aborigines (mythology)
 Sun Wukong

References

External links

Autochthonous The Soil's Offspring by Carlos Parada

 
Society of ancient Greece
Historiography of Greece
Culture in Classical Athens
Legendary tribes in Greco-Roman historiography